All Fall Down is the title of the 77s' second album, released in 1984 on the Exit Records label.

Track listing
 Side one
 "Ba-Ba-Ba-Ba"
 "Under the Heat"
 "Mercy Mercy"
 "You Don't Scare Me"
 "Make a Difference Tonight"

 Side two
 "Caught In an Unguarded Moment"
 "Someone New"
 "Somethings Holding On"
 "Your Pretty Baby"
 "Another Nail"

 Bonus tracks (CD)

 "Locked Inside This Moment" (Ballad Version)
 "Locked Inside This Moment" (Rock Version)
 "Someone New" (12" Version)
 "Jesus"
 "Tattoo"
Bonus tracks on CDs in the 123 boxset

The band
 Mike Roe — guitars and lead vocals
 Mark Tootle — keyboards, guitars and vocals
 Jan Eric — bass guitars and background vocals
 Aaron Smith — drums

References

1984 albums
The 77s albums